Eugnathides is an extinct genus of prehistoric bony fish that lived from the Oxfordian to the early Tithonian stage of the Late Jurassic epoch.

See also

 Prehistoric fish
 List of prehistoric bony fish

References

External links
 

Pachycormiformes
Late Jurassic fish